Rasboroides pallidus is a species of freshwater cyprinid fish endemic to southwestern Sri Lanka. It is only known from shallow, slow-flowing streams in the basins of the Kalu River, Bentara River, Gin River, Polathu-Modera River and Nilwala River. It has been introduced to the Mahaweli and Walawe River basins, and is overall less threatened than the related R. vaterifloris.

A comprehensive taxonomic review in 2018 based on morphometry, meristics and mtDNA disputed the validity of R. rohani, showing that it is a junior synonym of R. pallidus; this synonymy is followed by the Catalog of Fishes but not the FishBase.

It can grow to  standard length.

References

Rasboroides
Freshwater fish of Sri Lanka
Endemic fauna of Sri Lanka
Taxa named by Paulus Edward Pieris Deraniyagala
Fish described in 1930